Defending champion Monica Seles defeated Arantxa Sánchez Vicario in the final, 6–3, 6–3 to win the women's singles tennis title at the 1992 US Open. She did not lose a set during the tournament. By reaching the final, Seles became the sixth woman, after Maureen Connolly, Margaret Court, Chris Evert, Martina Navratilova, and Steffi Graf to reach all four major finals in a calendar year.

Seeds

Qualifying

Draw

Finals

Top half

Section 1

Section 2

Section 3

Section 4

Bottom half

Section 5

Section 6

Section 7

Section 8

External links
1992 US Open – Women's draws and results at the International Tennis Federation

Women's Singles
US Open (tennis) by year – Women's singles
1992 in women's tennis
1992 in American women's sports